Rhinella truebae is a species of toad in the family Bufonidae.
It is endemic to Colombia.

References

Rhamphophryne
Amphibians of Colombia
Taxonomy articles created by Polbot
Amphibians described in 1990